Abdul Rasul was an Iraqi nuclear engineer and a nuclear scientist. He was the central figure in Iraq's nuclear weapon program and is considered a nuclear weapon technologist. He was the head of Iraq's nuclear program from 1973 until 1981. He was heavily involved in France-Iraq nuclear cooperation deal. During his visit to France, he was poisoned at a Paris lunch by Mossad and died in 1981. Tzipi Livni, Israel's prominent and powerful politician is believed to be involved in his murder. He worked at Osirak, which was a nuclear reactor site reportedly involved in the development of nuclear weapons.

References

Year of birth missing
1981 deaths
Iraqi scientists
Iraqi nuclear physicists
Nuclear engineers
People killed in Mossad operations